Nathaniel Howard Williamson (December 23, 1904 – August 15, 1969) was an American professional baseball player. He played one season in Major League Baseball in 1928 for the St. Louis Cardinals, primarily as an outfielder.

References

External links

Major League Baseball outfielders
St. Louis Cardinals players
Syracuse Stars (minor league baseball) players
Houston Buffaloes players
Rochester Red Wings players
St. Joseph Saints players
Danville Veterans players
Texas Longhorns baseball players
Baseball players from Arkansas
1904 births
1969 deaths
Burials in Texas
Sportspeople from Little Rock, Arkansas